Caroline Scott may refer to:

Caroline Lucy Scott (1784–1857), English novelist
Caroline Scott (First Lady) (1832–1892), First Lady of the United States
Caroline Frederick Scott (died 1754), Scottish soldier of the British Army
Caroline Scott, beauty pageant contestant and 2015 winner of Miss Wyoming USA
Caroline Scott, a member of the pop group Slumber Party Girls

See also
Carolyn Scott,  American art director and set decorator